The American Cathedral in Paris, formally known as the Cathedral Church of the Holy Trinity, is one of the oldest English-speaking churches in Paris.  It is the gathering church for the Convocation of Episcopal Churches in Europe, and is part of the worldwide Anglican Communion. The church is located in central Paris between the Champs-Elysées and the River Seine at 23 avenue George V in the 8th arrondissement.  The closest métro stations are Alma – Marceau   and George V  .

History

The origins of the American Cathedral of the Holy Trinity, an English-speaking Episcopal church in Paris, date back to the 1830s when American Episcopalians began to meet together for services in the garden pavilion of the Hôtel Matignon, now the official residence of the French prime minister, then the home of American expatriate Colonel Herman Thorn (1783–1859). In 1859, the formal establishment of a parish took place and in 1864 the first church building was consecrated on Rue Bayard.

It was in the 1870s that John B. Morgan, who was a cousin of J. P. Morgan, became the rector of Holy Trinity Parish. He decided that the congregation needed a larger church and began a fund-raising effort which was successful in raising the money needed. The site that was purchased for construction is on Avenue George V (then called Avenue de l'Alma) and was originally part of the estate of the half-brother of Emperor Napoléon III, the Duc de Morny. The plans were approved in October 1882 and construction was completed in less than four years. The church had its inaugural services in September 1886.

Consecration of the church took place on Thanksgiving Day, 25 November 1886, which coincided with the dedication of the Statue of Liberty in New York. Holy Trinity became a cathedral in 1922, continuing as a parish church and also serving as the official seat of the bishop in charge of Episcopal churches in Europe.

The cathedral appears in the painting Après l'Office à l'Église de la Sainte-Trinité, Noël 1890 ("After the Service at Holy Trinity Church, Christmas 1890") by Jean Béraud. The original painting is on loan to the Musée Carnavalet in the 3rd arrondissement.

During the German occupation of France during World War II (1940–44), the cathedral was taken over by the German military chaplaincy.

The congregation of the American Cathedral is composed of around four hundred permanent parishioners supplemented by many students, tourists, and business travelers. The ministries of the church include parish life, Christian education, development, finance, mission and outreach, community outreach, stewardship, the 20s and 30s group, and music. The building hosts a bilingual Montessori school, recovery groups such as AA, a weekly free concert series on Sundays sponsored by Les Arts George V, and many more community-based services.

Architecture

The current building was designed by English architect George Edmund Street, who had also designed the American Church in Rome, in the Gothic Revival style.  He subscribed to what he called "ethical architecture," such that if something seems to be a column made of marble, then it should be an actual column, needed for a structural reason, made of marble.

Street died in December 1881 before the finalization of plans and his son, Arthur E. Street, as well as Arthur Blomfield, took over the work. While the chancel and aisles vaults are stone, the nave is vaulted in oak, perhaps due to the constrained site preventing the buttresses that would be required for the weight of a stone ceiling. The construction was accomplished by Henry Lovatt of Wolverhampton.

While the main part of the church was completed by 1886, construction on the tower and other work continued for more than two decades. The stained-glass windows were designed by James Bell and constructed between 1883 and 1893. Forty-two in number, their theme is the words of the Te Deum. The tower, at  among the tallest in Paris, was dedicated on Easter Sunday in 1909.

Gallery

See also

American Church in Paris
American Church in Berlin
American Church in Rome
The Scots Kirk

References

Sources

External links
Official website

Paris
American Cathedral in Paris
Protestant churches in Paris
Anglican church buildings in France
American expatriates in France
Buildings and structures in the 8th arrondissement of Paris
Cathedrals in Paris
19th-century churches in France
19th-century Anglican church buildings